Questelles is a town in Saint Andrew Parish, Saint Vincent and the Grenadines.

References

Populated places in Saint Vincent and the Grenadines